The Special Honours Lists for Australia are announced by the Sovereign and Governor-General at any time.

Some honours are awarded by other countries where Queen Elizabeth II is the Head of State and Australians receiving those honours are listed here with the prevalent reference.

Order of Australia

Officer (AO) 
 Honorary – General
 Christophe Lecourtier – 18 June 2018 – For distinguished service to strengthening the Australia – France bilateral relationship.
 Ashi Tashi Dorji – 11 July 2018 – For distinguished service to Australia – Bhutan bilateral relations, particularly to the education sector.
 Édouard Philippe – 11 November 2018 – For distinguished service in support of Australia’s bilateral relations with France.

 Honorary – Military
 Lieutenant General John A. Toolan, USMC – 29 January 2018 – For distinguished service to the military relationship between Australia and the United States of America by establishing the Marine Forces Rotation program, and in recognition of his efforts to enhance the Australian Defence Force amphibious capability.
 Admiral Harry B. Harris Jr., USN – 21 May 2018 – For distinguished service to the military relationship between Australia and the United States through leadership, passion and strategic foresight and in recognition of his efforts to enhance the close and longstanding defence relationship between the United States and Australia.
 Lieutenant General Perry Lim – 21 May 2018 – For distinguished service to the military relationship between Australia and Singapore through leadership, passion and strategic foresight and in recognition of his efforts to enhance the close and longstanding defence relationship between Singapore and Australia.
 General Joseph Dunford, USMC – 26 June 2018 – For distinguished service to the military relationship between Australia and the United States through leadership, passion and strategic foresight, and in recognition of his efforts to enhance the longstanding defence Alliance between Australia and the United States.
 Admiral Michael S. Rogers, USN – 17 September 2018 – For distinguished service in fostering the military relationship between Australia and the United States through exceptional leadership, passion and strategic foresight; and in recognition of his extraordinary contributions to enhancing the Australian Defence Force cyber capability.

Member (AM) 
 Honorary – General
 Bernard Jean Bories – 11 November 2018 – For significant service in the promotion and presentation of the Australian film industry and culture in France.
 Stéphane Jacob-Langevin – 11 November 2018 – For significant service to the promotion of Indigenous Australian art and artists.
 Yves Tate – 11 November 2018 – For significant service to Australia-France relations, particularly the commemoration of Australian soldiers who served in World War I.

Medal (OAM) 
 General
 Senior Constable Justin John Bateman – 24 July 2018 – For service to the international community through specialist response roles during the Tham Luang cave rescue in Thailand in 2018.
 Leading Senior Constable Kelly Craig Boers – 24 July 2018 – For service to the international community through specialist response roles during the Tham Luang cave rescue in Thailand in 2018.
 Dr Craig Challen – 24 July 2018 – For service to the international community through specialist response roles during the Tham Luang cave rescue in Thailand in 2018.
 Detective Leading Senior Constable – 24 July 2018 – For service to the international community through specialist response roles during the Tham Luang cave rescue in Thailand in 2018.
 Benjamin Walter Cox – 24 July 2018 – For service to the international community through specialist response roles during the Tham Luang cave rescue in Thailand in 2018.
 Chief Petty Officer Troy Matthew Eather – 24 July 2018 – For service to the international community through specialist response roles during the Tham Luang cave rescue in Thailand in 2018.
 First Constable Matthew Peter Fitzgerald – 24 July 2018 – For service to the international community through specialist response roles during the Tham Luang cave rescue in Thailand in 2018.
 Dr Richard Harris – 24 July 2018 – For service to the international community through specialist response roles during the Tham Luang cave rescue in Thailand in 2018.
 Acting Station Sergeant Robert Michael James – 24 July 2018 – For service to the international community through specialist response roles during the Tham Luang cave rescue in Thailand in 2018.
 Detective Leading Senior Constable Christopher John Markcrow – 24 July 2018 – For service to the international community through specialist response roles during the Tham Luang cave rescue in Thailand in 2018.

 Honorary – General
 Thérèse Dheygers – 11 November 2018 – For service to Australia-France relations, particularly preserving the memory of Australian soldiers who served in World War I.
 Yves Potard – 11 November 2018 – For service to Australia-France relations, particularly preserving the memory of Australian World War 1 soldiers who fought in the Battle of Pozieres

Royal Victorian Order

Commander (CVO)
 Mark Thomas Fraser,  — Formerly Official Secretary to the Governor-General of Australia. - 28 December 2018

Lieutenant (LVO)
 Carol Buckley,  — Official Secretary to the Governor of Western Australia. - 28 December 2018

Star of Courage (SC) 

 Dr Craig Challen – 24 July 2018 – For acts of conspicuous courage in circumstances of great peril.
 Dr Richard Harris – 24 July 2018 – For acts of conspicuous courage in circumstances of great peril.

Medal for Gallantry (MG) 

 Richard Kenneth Hawkins – 8 August 2018 – For acts of gallantry in action in hazardous circumstances as a machine gunner with 6 Platoon, B company, 2nd Battalion the Royal Australian Regiment on 15 December 1970.
 Ian Aubrey Reid – 8 August 2018 – For acts of gallantry in action in hazardous circumstances as the Platoon Medical Assistant with 7 Platoon, Charlie Company, 7th Battalion the Royal Australian Regiment during a platoon ambush near the village of Phuoc Loi in South Vietnam on 30 April 1970.

Bravery Medal (BM) 

 Senior Constable Justin John Bateman – 24 July 2018 – For acts of bravery in hazardous circumstances.
 Leading Senior Constable Kelly Craig Boers – 24 July 2018 – For acts of bravery in hazardous circumstances.
 Detective Leading Senior Constable Benjamin Walter Cox – 24 July 2018 – For acts of bravery in hazardous circumstances.
 Chief Petty Officer Troy Matthew Eather – 24 July 2018 – For acts of bravery in hazardous circumstances.
 First Constable Matthew Peter Fitzgerald – 24 July 2018 – For acts of bravery in hazardous circumstances.
 Acting Station Sergeant Robert Michael James – 24 July 2018 – For acts of bravery in hazardous circumstances.
 Detective Leading Senior Constable Christopher John Markcrow – 24 July 2018 – For acts of bravery in hazardous circumstances.

Distinguished Service Medal (DSM) 

 Lieutenant Colonel Gregory Vivian Gilbert – 6 February 2018 – For distinguished leadership in warlike operations as Forward Observer, 12th Field Regiment attached to Delta Company, 4th Battalion, the Royal Australian Regiment, in Vietnam, on 21 September 1971.

Australian Antarctic Medal (AAM) 

 Graham David Cook – 21 June 2018
 Garry Studd – 21 June 2018
 Martin Travers Tucker – 21 June 2018
 The late John Alfred Oakes – 21 June 2018

Unit Citation for Gallantry 

 1st Australian Task Force – 15 May 2018 – For extraordinary gallantry in action in the Dinh Duong/Bien Hoa Provinces of South Vietnam from 12 May 1968 to 6 June 1968, during Operation Thoan Thang.

Order of St John

Knight of the Order of St John 
 Brian Cantlon,  – 26 July 2018

Commander of the Order of St John 
 Michael Connelly – 26 July 2018
 Robert Wilson – 26 July 2018

Officer of the Order of St John 
 Alistair Dunn – 26 July 2018

Member of the Order of St John 
 Ashely Bear – 26 July 2018
 Jack Boessler – 26 July 2018
 Anita Christini – 26 July 2018
 Dr Daniel Compton – 26 July 2018
 George Hetrel – 26 July 2018
 Patricia Hetrel – 26 July 2018
 Ryan Jacobsen – 26 July 2018
 Robyn Jones – 26 July 2018
 Claire Moore – 26 July 2018
 Fillip Pritchett – 26 July 2018
 Coling Pumpa – 26 July 2018
 Petra Reynolds – 26 July 2018

References

External links 
Special Honours Lists, Governor General of Australia

Orders, decorations, and medals of Australia
2018 awards in Australia